is a professional Japanese baseball player. He plays outfielder for the Yokohama DeNA BayStars.

External links

 NPB.com

1994 births
Living people
Baseball people from Okinawa Prefecture
Chuo University alumni
Japanese baseball players
Nippon Professional Baseball outfielders
Yokohama DeNA BayStars players